Ourmiavirus is a genus of positive-strand RNA viruses. Cucurbits, cherry, and cassava serve as natural hosts. There are three species in this genus. Diseases associated with this genus include: OuMV: yellowing and chlorotic spot symptoms.

Structure

Viruses in the genus Ourmiavirus are non-enveloped, with icosahedral and bacilliform geometries, and T=1 symmetry. The diameter is around 18 nm, with a length of 30 nm.

Genome
Genomes are linear and segmented, around 2.8kb in length.

Life cycle
Viral replication is cytoplasmic. Entry into the host cell is achieved by penetration into the host cell. Replication follows the positive stranded RNA virus replication model. Positive stranded RNA virus transcription is the method of transcription. The virus exits the host cell by tubule-guided viral movement. Cucurbits, cherry, and  cassava serve as the natural host.

Taxonomy
The genus has three species:

Cassava virus C
Epirus cherry virus
Ourmia melon virus

References

External links
 ICTV Report: Ourmiavirus
 Viralzone: Ourmiavirus

Positive-sense single-stranded RNA viruses
Virus genera